Waikiki Brothers is a 2001 South Korean film, set in the 1980s, about a group of high school friends who form a band. It was the opening film of the 2001 Jeonju International Film Festival.

Plot
Waikiki Brothers is a band going nowhere. After another depressing gig, the saxophonist quits, leaving the three remaining members - lead singer and guitarist Sung-woo (Lee Eol), keyboardist Jung-seok (Park Won-sang), and drummer Kang-soo (Hwang Jung-min), to continue on the road. The band ends up at Sung-woo's hometown, Suanbo, which was a popular hot spring resort in the '80s. The main resort now is the Waikiki Hotel, and their gig at the hotel nightclub starts well, until Jung-seok and Kang-soo start to play out their worst vices. For Sung-woo, the calm center of the band, the return home is filled with reservations of disappointments and a lost love. He reunites with his old high school friends, the original Waikiki Brothers, and finds them far from happy. He runs into In-hee (Oh Ji-hye), his unrequited first love. Now widowed, she seems desperate to try their relationship again. Sung-woo also runs into his old music teacher, Byung-joo, and tries to help him get work. But the band is fired from the nightclub and Sung-woo is forced to perform in karaoke bars. And, then, tragedy strikes when his high school classmate Soo-chul dies in an accident.

Cast
 Lee Eol - Sung-woo
 Park Won-sang - Jung-seok
 Hwang Jung-min - Kang-soo
 Oh Kwang-rok - Hyun-gu
 Oh Ji-hye - In-hee
 Ryoo Seung-bum - Gi-tae
 Park Hae-il - young Sung-woo
 Kim Jong-eon - young Soo-chul
 Jung Dae-yong - Min-soo
 Moon Hye-won - young In-hee
 Joo Jin-mo - man selling items at rest area
 Lee Dong-yong - Busan bum 1
 Lee Tae-ri - young In-ki - (credit as Lee Min-ho)
 Lee Bong-kyu - manager
 Han Ki-joong - Min-soo

Critical reception
Cine21 film critic Shim Young-seop said, "You can see how much (director) Im feels attached to the world. Though the characters are deceived by reality, they cannot hate the world; they still love it. Small-budgeted but artistic films such as Waikiki Brothers, films that depict modern ordinary Koreans as they truly are, those are the best movies and the most authentically Korean."

Adaptation
In 2004, it inspired a musical titled Go! Waikiki Brothers starring North Korean defector Kim Young-un, which also performed in Los Angeles in 2006.

References

External links 
 
 
 

2001 films
2000s musical drama films
South Korean musical drama films
South Korean rock music films
Films directed by Yim Soon-rye
Myung Films films
CJ Entertainment films
2000s Korean-language films
2001 drama films
2000s South Korean films